Ibrahim El-Masry may refer to the following Egyptian people:
 Ibrahim El-Masry (footballer)
 Ibrahim El-Masry (handballer)